The Fourth Camp of Rochambeau's Army is a historic military camp site near Plains Road and Lovers Lane on the banks of the Shetucket River in Windham, Connecticut.  It was here that the French Army under the command of  Rochambeau encamped in the summer of 1781, en route from Providence, Rhode Island to the New York City area.  Four divisions passed through, each one night apart, starting with the Bourbonnais on June 21, then the Royal Deux-Ponts, then the Soissonnais, and finally the Saintonge division, on successive nights.  One of Rochambeau's aides described Windham at the time as "a charming market town, where, incidentally, there were many pretty women at whose homes we passed the afternoon very agreeably."  Of the camp site, he wrote, "A mile away is a beautiful river (the Shetucket) with a fine wooden bridge. We camped on its banks very comfortably, though hardly militarily."

The camp site was listed on the National Register of Historic Places in 2003.  The next campsite to the west is also NRHP-listed, as Fifth Camp of Rochambeau's Infantry.  On the army's return trip in 1782, its 47th camp site (also NRHP-listed) was at a different location in Windham. The site is one of multiple properties whose possible listing on the National Register was covered in a 2001 study.

See also
Washington–Rochambeau Revolutionary Route
List of historic sites preserved along Rochambeau's route
National Register of Historic Places listings in Windham County, Connecticut

References

Military facilities on the National Register of Historic Places in Connecticut
Buildings and structures in Windham County, Connecticut
Windham, Connecticut
Historic places on the Washington–Rochambeau Revolutionary Route
American Revolutionary War sites
Connecticut in the American Revolution